Dáinsleif ("Dáinn's Heirloom") is king Högni's sword, according to Snorri Sturluson's account of the battle known as the Hjaðningavíg.

When Heðinn offers him compensation for the abduction of his daughter, Högni replies:

In popular culture
Genshin Impact, a 2020 action role-playing game, features a character named 'Dainsleif', also known as "Bough Keeper" in the lore.
Senki Zesshō Symphogear, a Japanese anime television franchise animated by Satelight features an ancient relic in the form of a sword, named 'Dáinsleif'.
Several games in the Castlevania series feature 'Dáinsleif' as a usable weapon.
 ‘’Mobile Suit Gundam:Iron Blooded Orphans The Dainsleif was introduced as a banned weapon of war. It was a mobile suit hand held rail gun that fired rods at hyper velocity that would rip through anything it hit with ease.
 ‘’Black summoner’’ Dainsleif was the S rank sword made for Gerard Fragarach by Kelvin Celsius.

Notes

References

Mythological Norse weapons
Mythological swords